Swachh Dhan Abhiyan (English: Operation Clean Money) is a project launched by Income Tax Department, Ministry of Finance, Government of India on 31 January 2017 in New Delhi. It has a programming software which is being used to get answers on all the deposits made and after preliminary answers from the people. 

It is inspired by Swachh Bharat Abhiyan, an initiative to Clean India. Swachh Dhan Abhiyan is about Clean Money, a reflection of the government's anti-corruption drive.

See also
 Indian black money
 2016 Indian banknote demonetisation
 Corruption in India
 MyGov.in

References

Modi administration initiatives
2017 in India